Non-exact solutions in general relativity are solutions of Albert Einstein's field equations of general relativity which hold only approximately. These solutions are typically found by treating the gravitational field, as a background space-time, (which is usually an exact solution) plus some small perturbation, .

A common example of this method results in the linearised Einstein field equations.  In this case we expand the full space-time metric about the flat Minkowski metric, :

,

See also
 Exact solutions in general relativity
 Linearized gravity
 Post-Newtonian expansion
 Parameterized post-Newtonian formalism
 Numerical relativity

References

General relativity